Legislative elections were held in Greece on 7 July 2019. The elections were called by Prime Minister Alexis Tsipras on 26 May 2019 after the ruling Syriza party lost the European and  local elections. They were the first national elections since the voting age was lowered to 17, and the number of parliamentary constituencies was increased from 56 to 59. Athens B, the largest constituency before the 2018 reforms, with 44 seats, was broken up into smaller constituencies, the largest of which had 18 seats.

The result was a victory for the centre-right liberal conservative New Democracy party led by Kyriakos Mitsotakis, which received nearly 40% of the vote and won 158 seats, an outright majority.

Electoral system

Compulsory voting was in force for the elections, with voter registration being automatic. However, none of the legally existing penalties or sanctions have ever been enforced.

A number of changes to the electoral system were introduced following the September 2015 elections. The voting age was reduced from 18 to 17 in July 2016, with the same law also abolishing the majority bonus system, which gave a 50-seat bonus to the largest party. Instead, all 300 seats would be awarded proportionally. However, this law did not come into effect for the 2019 elections, as it was not approved with the required supermajority despite the Syriza-led government expressing support for its introduction for the 2019 elections. As a result, the previous system remained in force, with 250 seats elected in multi-member constituencies using a 3% electoral threshold, plus 50 bonus seats for the largest party.
 
The number of parliamentary constituencies was also modified in December 2018, with Athens B split into Athens B1 (North), Athens B2 (West), and Athens B3 (South), while Attica was split into East Attica and West Attica.

Opinion polls

Conduct
A few minutes before the polls closed, a group of young protesters stormed the 33rd polling station in the distinct of Exarcheia, Athens, and stole the ballot box. A previously-unknown anarchist group, Ballot-seeking Arsonists, later claimed responsibility. It claimed to have burned the stolen ballot box. As a result, a repeat election at the same polling station was held a week later, on 14 July. The results did not change the final allocation of seats because of the small volume of votes.

Results

References

2019 in Greek politics
Greece
Legislative
Greece
Parliamentary elections in Greece